Romania was represented by Mădălina & Andrada at the Junior Eurovision Song Contest 2008 with the song "Salvaţi planeta!", a song about saving the planet. "Salvaţi planeta!" was the winner of the Romanian national final Selecţia Naţională Eurovision Junior 2008, held on 1 June 2008.

Before Eurovision

Selecţia Naţională Eurovision Junior 2008 
The final took place on 1 June 2008, hosted by Alina Sorescu and Iulia Ciobanu. 12 songs took part and the winner was determined by a 50/50 combination of votes from a jury panel and a public televote. The winner was "Salvaţi planeta!" performed by Mădălina & Andrada.

As there was a tie at the end of the voting, the results of the jury vote took precedence.

Revamp of the song 
The melody of the song has changed slightly from the version sang at the National Final (which can be heard here). The revised version can be heard here.

At Eurovision 
On 14 October 2008 the running order for Junior Eurovision took place, and the Romanian song was given the spot to perform first. At Junior Eurovision, the Romanian performers wore dresses symbolising the four seasons and water. The presentation was very similar to that of the national final. Behind the dancers was a giant globe. The song placed in 9th position with 58 points. The entry also received points from every country, the most being eight points from Cyprus and Macedonia.

Voting

Notes

References

External links 
 Official Romanian Junior Eurovision Site of 2008 

Junior Eurovision Song Contest
Romania
Junior